University of the Air may refer to:

University of the Air (TV series) (1966–1983), a Canadian educational television series
University of the Air (CBC radio series) (1960s), a Canadian Broadcasting Corporation radio educational programme
University of the Air, a radio program from the University of Wisconsin–Madison airing on Wisconsin Public Radio
University of the Air, the former name of the Japanese distance learning university now known as The Open University of Japan
NBC University of the Air (1920s-1940s), a network radio series in the United States